The Bagalini Bagaliante (a portmanteau of "Bagalini" and "Glider") is an Italian high-wing, strut-braced, single-seat, pusher configuration, conventional landing gear motor glider that was designed by Marino Bagalini and made available as plans for amateur construction.

Design and development
The Bagaliante is constructed from wood and metal and is of pod-and-boom layout.

The  span wing employs a Göttingen 535 airfoil at the wing root, transitioning to an NACA 4412 section at the wingtip. The wing uses a semi-tapered planform, tapering outboard of the mid-span point. The specified engine is a  Rotax 277 two-stroke aircraft engine, mounted aft of the cockpit and driving a pusher propeller mounted above the tail boom. The fixed mainwheels  are located beside the fuselage on small sponsons.

Even with the small Rotax 277 fitted, the takeoff and landing distance is 

The estimated time to build the aircraft from the plans is 700 hours.

Specifications (Bagaliante)

See also

References

External links
Photos of Bagalini Bagaliante
Photo of Bagalini Bagaliante

Bagaliante
1980s Italian sailplanes
Homebuilt aircraft